Vilne is an urban-type settlement in the Dzhankoi Raion of Crimea. Population:

References

External links
 

Dzhankoi Raion
Urban-type settlements in Crimea